Rosa María Hernández Cedeño (born 29 July 1983) is a Panamanian model and beauty pageant titleholder. She was born in Los Santos, Panamá, and was the official representative of Panamá in the 54th Miss Universe 2005 pageant, was held at the Impact Arena, Bangkok, Thailand, on 31 May 2005.

She represented Los Santos state.

References

External links
Señorita Panamá official website
Miss Panama

1983 births
Living people
Miss Universe 2005 contestants
Panamanian beauty pageant winners
Panamanian female models
People from Los Santos Province
Señorita Panamá